Mengelberg is a surname. Notable people with the surname include:

Augustin Mengelberg (1710–1763), abbot of Kloster Heisterbach
Egidius Mengelberg (1770–1849), German portrait painter
Friedrich Wilhelm Mengelberg (1837–1919), German-Dutch sculptor, grandson of Egidius Mengelberg
Heinrich Otto Mengelberg (1841–1891), German sculptor, brother of Friedrich Wilhelm Mengelberg
Karel Mengelberg (1902–1984), Dutch composer and music writer, nephew of Willem Mengelberg
Käthe Bauer-Mengelberg (1894–1968), German sociologist, sister of Rudolf Mengelberg
Misha Mengelberg (1935–2017), Dutch jazz pianist and composer, son of Karel Mengelberg
Otto Mengelberg (1817–1890), German portrait and historical painter, son of Egidius Mengelberg
Otto Maria Maximiliaan Mengelberg (1868–1934), Dutch sculptor and stained-glass artist, son of Friedrich Wilhelm Mengelberg
Rudolf Mengelberg (1892–1959), Dutch composer, musicologist and chief executive of the  Concertgebouw Orchestra, nephew of Willem Mengelberg
Willem Mengelberg (1871–1951), Dutch conductor of the Concertgebouw Orchestra, son of Friedrich Wilhelm Mengelberg

German-language surnames
Mengelberg family